Index Islamicus is a bibliography database of publications about Islam and the Muslim world, first compiled in 1956 by James Douglas Pearson. It is compiled by C.H. Bleaney & S. Sinclair and the School of Oriental and African Studies, London, and published by Brill Publishers.

References

External links 
 About II , Brill
 Index Islamicus, CSA

Bibliographic databases and indexes